Stan Verrett (born ) is an American sportscaster on the ESPN and ESPNEWS networks. Most of his appearances are on SportsCenter at 11 p.m or 1 a.m. Eastern time, Monday through Friday. He has also hosted studio segments on ESPN's college basketball and college football telecasts, and has appeared as a sideline reporter, working ArenaBowl XXII.

Life and career
Verrett attended St. Augustine High School in New Orleans and Howard University Washington, D.C. Verrett is a member of Alpha Phi Alpha fraternity.

He was known as "Stan The Man", a radio DJ on WOWI 103 Jamz in the Hampton Roads, VA area. While in the area, Verrett was a sports anchor on ABC affiliate WVEC-TV 13 and also had a stint on local NBC affiliate WAVY-TV 10.

In April 2009, Verrett began working from ESPN's then-new L.A. Live studios, anchoring the 10:00 p.m. PST SportsCenter along with Neil Everett. In August 2016, he was named studio host for ESPN's college football coverage airing on sister network ABC, replacing John Saunders, who died earlier that month.

He is a cousin of Jason Verrett.

References

External links 
 Stan Verrett's ESPN Bio
 

People from New Orleans
African-American sports announcers
Arena football announcers
American television sports announcers
College football announcers
College basketball announcers in the United States
African-American sports journalists
American sports journalists
African-American television personalities
Living people
Howard University alumni
ArenaBowl broadcasters
St. Augustine High School (New Orleans) alumni
21st-century African-American people
20th-century African-American people
Year of birth missing (living people)